Ethmia soljanikovi is a moth in the family Depressariidae. It is found in Mongolia and Russia (Tuva, Altai).

Adults have been recorded from early July to early August.

References

Moths described in 1975
soljanikovi